Pulpo is the Spanish word for "octopus". It may also refer to:

Nickname
 Antonio Alfonseca (born 1972), Dominican former Major League Baseball relief pitcher nicknamed "El Pulpo"
 Gilberto "Pulpo" Colón Jr. (born 1953), American pianist, composer, arranger, producer and band leader
 Norberto Esbrez (1966-2014), Argentine tango dancer, choreographer and teacher nicknamed "El Pulpo"
 José Luis Quiñónez (born 1984), Ecuadorian footballer nicknamed "El Pulpo"
 Pulpo Romero (born 1984), Spanish football goalkeeper
 Martín Zúñiga (born 1970), Mexican soccer analyst, sports anchor and former Major League Soccer goalkeeper nicknamed "El Pulpo"
 Eduardo Simián (1915-1995), Chilean football goalkeeper, Politician, nicknamed "Pulpo" during his playing career

Other uses
 , a US Navy submarine chaser transferred to the Argentine Navy and renamed ARA Pulpo
 ¡Pulpo!, a 1997 album by Glaswegian lo-fi rock indie band Urusei Yatsura
 United Fruit Company, an American corporation sometimes called "el pulpo"

Lists of people by nickname